Tuomas Laaksonen (born 9 March 1990) is a Finnish male Javelin thrower, who won an individual gold medal at the Youth World Championships.

References

External links

1990 births
Living people
Finnish male javelin throwers